António Morais may refer to:

 Nuno Morais (athlete) (1923–1986), Portuguese sprinter
 António Morais (football manager) (1934–1989), Portuguese football forward and manager